Alain Renoir (October 31, 1921 – December 12, 2008) was a French-American writer and literature professor, son of filmmaker Jean Renoir and actress Catherine Hessling, and grandson of impressionist painter Pierre-Auguste Renoir.

Renoir was born in Cagnes-sur-Mer, the only son of Jean Renoir. As a teenager Renoir worked in a few of his father's films, including House Party (1936), as assistant cameraman on The Human Beast (1938) and The Rules of the Game (1939). In 1942 he joined his father in the United States, enlisted in the American Army and served in combat in the Pacific.

After the war, he studied English literature and comparative literature, earning his PhD from Harvard University in 1956. Renoir became a professor at the University of California, Berkeley, where he founded the Department of Comparative Literature in 1966. He was considered a leading scholar of medieval English literature and published books on Beowulf and John Lydgate. 

After retiring, he spent his last years running a small sustainable farm in north central California, doing much of the work himself.

He had three children, John, Peter and Anne.

References

External links
 IMDb database bio

1921 births
2008 deaths
People from Cagnes-sur-Mer
University of California, Berkeley faculty
Harvard University alumni
French emigrants to the United States
Alain